The Womanagh River (Irish: An Uaimneach) is a river in County Cork, Ireland.

Course
The Womanagh River rises on Knockastrickeen and flows eastwards through Ladysbridge and loops around northwards, eastwards and southwards. It passes under the R633 at the Cromponn Bridge and flows into the Celtic Sea.

Wildlife
Fish include brown trout, salmon, brook lamprey, stickleback and stone loach.

Archaeology
A bronze sword was found in the river in 1883.

References

Rivers of County Cork